Sueo Fujishiro (born 11 April 1949) is a Japanese weightlifter. He competed in the men's light heavyweight event at the 1976 Summer Olympics.

References

1949 births
Living people
Japanese male weightlifters
Olympic weightlifters of Japan
Weightlifters at the 1976 Summer Olympics
Place of birth missing (living people)
Asian Games medalists in weightlifting
Weightlifters at the 1974 Asian Games
Asian Games gold medalists for Japan
Medalists at the 1974 Asian Games
20th-century Japanese people